{{DISPLAYTITLE:C11H9N3O}}
The molecular formula C11H9N3O (molar mass: 199.21 g/mol) may refer to:

 3-Pyridylnicotinamide (3-pna), or N-(pyridin-3-yl)nicotinamide
 4-Pyridylnicotinamide (4-PNA)

Molecular formulas